Tytus Chałubiński (Radom, 29 December 1820 – 4 November 1889, Zakopane) was a Polish physician and co-founder of the Polish Tatra Society.

Chałubiński established tuberculosis sanatoria in Zakopane, in the Tatra Mountains. He was a professor at the Medical-Surgical Academy and Principal School in Warsaw.

See also
List of Poles

References

 Stefan Kieniewicz, Andrzej Zahorski, Władysław Zajewski, Trzy powstania narodowe, 1992, 300 pages
 
 Stanisław Feliksiak, Słownik biologów polskich, 1987, Państwowe Wydawnictwo Naukowe, Warsaw, pp. 94–95

External links

 

1820 births
1889 deaths
People from Radom
19th-century Polish physicians
Polish mountain climbers
Sportspeople from Masovian Voivodeship